Moreland Township is an inactive township in Scott County, in the U.S. state of Missouri.

Moreland Township was erected in 1822, and named after a pioneer citizen.

References

Townships in Missouri
Townships in Scott County, Missouri